Arturo Francesco "Art" Merzario (born 11 March 1943 in Civenna, Como) (erroneously registered as Arturio on his birth certificate) is a racing driver from Italy. He participated in 85 Formula One World Championship Grands Prix, debuting at the 1972 British Grand Prix. He scored 11 championship points.

Racing career
Merzario began his career as a test driver with works Fiat Abarths, subsequently participating to GT racing and European mountain-climb events. In 1969 he won the Mugello Grand Prix in a 2-litre Abarth ahead of a field which included Nino Vaccarella and Andrea de Adamich. This brought him a drive with the Ferrari sportscar team for 1970. In 1972, he won the Spa 1000 km, the Targa Florio and the Rand 9 Hour races and was also European two-litre Champion for Abarth.

Formula One
Merzario made his Formula One debut in 1972, and became one of the few drivers to score points at their first race by finishing in sixth place in the British Grand Prix at Brands Hatch. In 1973 Ferrari confirmed him for the whole season alongside Jacky Ickx. Merzario had a promising start with the old 312B2, finishing fourth in Brazil and South Africa. However, Ferrari's evolved car, the 312B3, proved to be a disappointment, and both he and Ickx struggled for the rest of the season. Deeply unimpressed with the way the season had unfolded, Enzo Ferrari decided to change the whole team for the 1974 season, and Merzario moved to Williams. After finishing third in a non-Championship race in Brazil, Merzario scored points at Monza and in South Africa. However, the Williams cars were largely uncompetitive, and in 1975, after a one-off with the Copersucar at Monza, where he finished eleventh, Merzario returned to sports cars with Alfa Romeo — winning four races plus the Targa Florio again.

Merzario returned to Formula One full-time in 1976, initially with the works March. After a run of disappointing results — and disgruntled with his situation — he moved to Wolf, who had just merged his team with Frank Williams Racing Cars, replacing Jacky Ickx; but, again, there were no decent results.
During the 1976 German Grand Prix, Niki Lauda crashed heavily; Merzario was one of the drivers, along with Guy Edwards, Brett Lunger and Harald Ertl who stopped to help, effectively pulling Lauda out of the burning car. 37 years later, in an interview with BBC Radio 5 linked to the release of Rush, Lauda stated that "Merzario jumped into the fire and, alone, pulled me out of the wreckage so I survived… he really saved my life there, because a couple of seconds more I would have never made it." Six weeks later after the incident, at the Italian Grand Prix, Lauda returned to race again and presented his gold Rolex wristwatch to Merzario in gratitude for saving his life.

In 1977, Merzario was able to raise enough sponsors to set up his own Merzario team. The organization struggled in modern Formula One for three years, initially with March 761B cars. From 1978, Merzario began building cars of his own design and the team would eventually move down to Formula Two. In three seasons, the team was only classified on one occasion — at the 1977 Belgian Grand Prix at Zolder — when Merzario was officially placed fourteenth. During the season, he accepted a one-off drive with Shadow in the 1977 Austrian Grand Prix at the Österreichring, but a good drive led to retirement again. Merzario continued with his own chassis for two seasons, but results were very poor; the team's cars did not qualify on the majority of occasions, and often retired from the races they did start. The Merzario M1-BMW fared no better in Formula Two in 1980 but Merzario continued to race sports cars with some success after his works Formula One career finished.

During his time in Formula One, Merzario was often photographed wearing a cowboy hat with sponsorship patches from Marlboro. This became his signature look, and Merzario still wears the hat.

Sports cars and other competitions

Merzario began his career with Abarth in GT racing and mountain climbs; he also won the Sardinia Rally in 1963 in an Alfa Romeo Giulietta. He had several class wins throughout the 1960s; his victory in the Mugello Grand Prix of 1969 led to a Ferrari sports car drive. In 1970, he was third in the 24 hours of Daytona and fourth in the 1000 Kilometres of Monza using a Ferrari 512 S. Further wins followed in 1971 at Imola and Vallelunga for Ferrari and Abarth, respectively.

In 1972, Merzario won the  1000 Kilometres of Spa with Brian Redman in a Ferrari 312 PB, won the Targa Florio alongside Sandro Munari, and made his Formula One World Championship debut. In 1973, Merzario took second places in the 1000 Kilometres of Nürburgring and at Le Mans. Merzario also won the Targa Florio in 1975 with an Alfa Romeo T33, and his career continued in sports cars and GT racing into the 1990s; he won the 1985 Italian Prototype Championship, and later campaigned successfully with a Centenari M1.

Merzario was still active in sports car racing well into his sixties, driving mostly in an Italian prototype series.

Racing record

Complete 24 Hours of Le Mans results

Complete European Formula Two Championship results
(key)

Complete Formula One World Championship results
(key)

Formula One Non-Championship results
(key)

References

1943 births
Living people
Sportspeople from the Province of Como
Italian racing drivers
Italian Formula One drivers
Ferrari Formula One drivers
Williams Formula One drivers
Fittipaldi Formula One drivers
March Formula One drivers
Wolf Formula One drivers
Merzario Formula One drivers
Shadow Formula One drivers
Formula One team owners
Formula One team principals
24 Hours of Le Mans drivers
Porsche Supercup drivers
World Sportscar Championship drivers
24 Hours of Daytona drivers
Superstars Series drivers
International GT Open drivers
AF Corse drivers
Nürburgring 24 Hours drivers